Microcolona omphalias is a moth in the family Elachistidae. It is found in South Africa, where it has been recorded from Mpumalanga.

References

Endemic moths of South Africa
Moths described in 1913
Microcolona
Moths of Africa